Johann Wilhelm Haas (1649 – 1723), was a German trumpet maker and engraver.

Biography
He was born in Nuremberg and was a member of a family of trumpet makers. His baroque trumpets were used in courts across Germany and he carried on correspondence with court purveyors about repairs and replacements. He engraved his signature on the trumpets he repaired and replaced.

He died in Nuremberg.

References

Johann Wilhelm Haas correspondence on "Historic Brass" website

1649 births
1723 deaths
German engravers
Businesspeople from Nuremberg